Joan D. Vinge (born April 2, 1948 as Joan Carol Dennison) is an American science fiction author.  She is known for such works as her Hugo Award–winning novel The Snow Queen and its sequels, her series about the telepath named Cat, and her Heaven's Chronicles books. She also is the author of The Random House Book of Greek Myths (1999).

Biography
Vinge studied art in college, but eventually changed to a major in anthropology, and received a B.A. degree from San Diego State University in 1971.

Vinge has been married twice: first to fellow science fiction author Vernor Vinge from 1972 to 1979, and currently to science fiction editor James Frenkel since 1980. Vinge and Frenkel have two children, and live in Chapel Hill, North Carolina. She has taught at the Clarion Workshop several times, both East and West. Besides writing, Vinge also makes and sells dolls.

Robert A. Heinlein in part dedicated his 1982 novel Friday to Joan.

On March 2, 2002, Vinge was severely injured in a car accident that left her with "minor but debilitating" brain damage that, along with her fibromyalgia, left her unable to write. She recovered to the point of being able to resume writing around the beginning of 2007, and her first new book after the accident is the 2011 novelization of the movie Cowboys & Aliens.

Works
Vinge's first published story, "Tin Soldier", a novella, appeared in Orbit 14 in 1974. Her stories have also appeared in Analog, Millennial Women, Asimov's Science Fiction,  and several "Best of the Year" anthologies.

Several of her stories have won major awards: Her novel The Snow Queen won the 1981 Hugo Award for Best Novel.  "Eyes of Amber" won the 1977 Hugo Award for Best Novelette. She has also been nominated for several other Hugo and Nebula Awards, as well as for the John W. Campbell Award for Best New Writer.  Her novel Psion was named a Best Book for Young Adults by the American Library Association.

In March 2007, a new edition of her novel Psion was released, which includes a sequel novella, "Psiren", together in one volume.

At the time of her accident in 2002, Vinge had been working on a new, independent novel called Ladysmith, set in Bronze Age Europe; she resumed writing Ladysmith once she was able to begin writing again in 2007.

Bibliography

Heaven Chronicles 
 The Outcasts of Heaven Belt (1978)
 Legacy (1980)

The Snow Queen Cycle 
 The Snow Queen (1980)
 World's End (1984)
 The Summer Queen (1991)
 Tangled Up In Blue (2000)

Cat 
 Psion (1982)
 Catspaw (1988)
 Dreamfall (1996)

Collections 
 Fireship / Mother and Child (1978) - single-volume collection of two novellas.
 Eyes of Amber (1979) - 6 short stories
 Phoenix in the Ashes (1985) - 6 short stories
 Alien Blood (1988) - single-volume collection of Psion and its sequel Catspaw
 The Heaven Chronicles (1991) - single-volume collection of The Outcasts of Heaven's Belt and its sequel Legacy

Media novelizations and tie-ins 
 Star Wars: Return of the Jedi – The Storybook Based on the Movie (1983)
 Tarzan, King of the Apes (1983)
 The Dune Storybook  (1984)
 Return to Oz (1985)
 Mad Max Beyond Thunderdome (1985)
 Santa Claus: The Movie (1985)
 Santa Claus: The Movie Storybook (1985)
 Ladyhawke (1987)
 Willow (1988)
 Lost in Space (1998)
 Cowboys & Aliens (2011)
 47 Ronin (2013)

Short fiction 
 "Tin Soldier" (1974)
 "Mother and Child" (1975)
 "The Peddler's Apprentice" (with Vernor Vinge) (1975)
 "The Crystal Ship" (1976)
 "To Bell the Cat" (1977)
 "Eyes of Amber" (1977)
 "View from a Height" (1978)
 "Phoenix in the Ashes" (1978)
 "Fireship" (1978)
 "Psiren" (1980)
 "The Storm King" (1980)
 "Voices from the Dust" (1980)
 "The Hunt of the Unicorn" (1980)
 "Exorcycle" (1982)
 "Golden Girl and the Guardians of the Gemstones" (as by Billie Randall) (1985)
 "Tam Lin" (1985)
 "Latter-Day Martian Chronicles" (1990)
 "Murphy's Cat" (2000)

Poetry 
 "Phoenix" (1978)
 "Sun and Chimes Dropping" (1978)
 "Alien Lover" (1980)
 "There Are Songs" (1980)

References

External links
 Official site on SFF.net (archived 1 March 2017)
 

1948 births
20th-century American novelists
20th-century American poets
20th-century American short story writers
20th-century American women writers
21st-century American novelists
21st-century American poets
21st-century American short story writers
21st-century American women writers
American science fiction writers
American women novelists
American women poets
American women short story writers
Hugo Award-winning writers
Living people
20th-century Native American women
20th-century Native Americans
Novelists from California
Novelists from Maryland
Novelists from Wisconsin
People from Chula Vista, California
San Diego State University alumni
Women science fiction and fantasy writers
Writers from Baltimore
21st-century Native American women
21st-century Native Americans
Native American novelists
Native American short story writers
Native American poets